This is a list of lighthouses in Trinidad and Tobago.

Trinidad Lighthouses

Tobago Lighthouses

See also
 Lists of lighthouses and lightvessels

References

External links
 

Trinidad and Tobago
Lighthouses
 
Lighthouses